Sexualization (or sexualisation) is to make something sexual in character or quality or to become aware of sexuality, especially in relation to men and women. Sexualization is linked to sexual objectification. According to the American Psychological Association, sexualization occurs when "individuals are regarded as sex objects and evaluated in terms of their physical characteristics and sexiness." "In study after study, findings have indicated that women more often than men are portrayed in a sexual manner (e.g., dressed in revealing clothing, with bodily postures or facial expressions that imply sexual readiness) and are objectified (e.g., used as a decorative object, or as body parts rather than a whole person). In addition, a narrow (and unrealistic) standard of physical beauty is heavily emphasized. These are the models of femininity presented for young girls to study and emulate."  According to the Media Education Foundation's, Killing Us Softly 4: Advertising's Image of Women, the sexualization of girls in media and the ways women are portrayed in the dominant culture are detrimental to the development of young girls as they are developing their identities and understanding themselves as sexual beings.

Reports have found that sexualization of younger children is becoming increasingly more common in advertisements. Research has linked the sexualization of young girls to negative consequences for girls and society as a whole, finding that the viewing of sexually objectifying material can contribute to body dissatisfaction, eating disorders, low self-esteem, depression, and depressive affect. Medical and social science researchers generally deployed "sexualization" to refer to a liminal zone between sexual abuse and normal family life, in which the child's relationship with their parents was characterized by an "excessive", improper sexuality, even though no recognizable forms of abuse had occurred. The American Psychological Association also argues that the sexualization of young girls contributes to sexist attitudes within society and a societal tolerance of sexual violence as well as that consumerism and globalization have led to the sexualization of girls occurring across all advanced economies, in media and advertisements, to clothing and toys marketed for young girls.

Terminology
The term "sexualization" itself only emerged in Anglophone discourse in recent decades. Beginning in the mid-nineteenth century, the term was infrequently drawn upon by English-language writers to refer the assignation of a gendered frame to a particular object, such as the gendering of nouns (e.g., de Quincey [1839]1909, 195). In contrast, the term "asexualization" saw greater use, as a synonym for sterilization in eugenics discourse from around the turn of the twentieth century (e.g., Lydston 1904). The opposite or antonym to sexualization is desexualization.

Reports

Effects on children 
In 2006, an Australian report called Corporate paedophilia: sexualisation of children in Australia was published. The Australian report summarises its conclusion as follows:

Images of sexualised children are becoming increasingly common in advertising and marketing material. Children who appear aged 12 years and under are dressed, posed and made up in the same way as sexy adult models. Children that appear on magazines are seen older than they really are because of the sexualised clothes they are given to pose in. "Corporate paedophilia" is a metaphor used to describe advertising and marketing that sexualises children in these ways.

In 2007, the American Psychological Association published a report titled Report of the APA Task Force on the Sexualization of Girls, discussed below.

In 2010, the American Psychological Association published an additional report titled "Report of the APA Task Force on the Sexualization of Girls", which performed a study where college students were asked to try on and evaluate either a swimsuit or a sweater. While they waited for 10 minutes wearing the garment, they completed a math test. The results revealed that young women in swimsuits performed significantly worse on the math problems than did those wearing sweaters. The hypothesis is that individuals about to try on the sweaters had less pressure to look beautiful because they were not wearing revealing clothing therefore they performed better. 

In 2012, an American study found that self-sexualization was common among 6–9-year-old girls. Girls overwhelmingly chose the sexualized doll over the non-sexualized doll for their ideal self and as popular. However other factors, such as how often mothers talked to their children about what is going on in television shows and maternal religiosity, reduced those odds. Surprisingly, the mere quantity of girls' media consumption (television and movies) was unrelated to their self-sexualization for the most part; rather, maternal self-objectification and maternal religiosity moderated its effects.

However, in 2010, the Scottish Executive released a report titled External research on sexualised goods aimed at children. The report considers the drawbacks of the United States and Australian reviews, concluding:

The Scottish review also notes that:

It also notes that previous coverage "rests on moral assumptions … that are not adequately explained or justified."

Letting Children be Children: Report of an Independent Review of the Commercialisation and Sexualisation of Childhood (UK)
The report 'Letting Children Be Children', also known as the Bailey Report, is a report commissioned by the UK government on the subject of the commercialisation and sexualisation of childhood. The report was published in June 2011 and was commissioned as a result of concerns raised as to whether children's lives are negatively affected by the effects of commercialisation and sexualisation.

The Bailey Report is so-called as it was researched and compiled by Reg Bailey, the Chief Executive of the Mothers' Union, a "charity supporting parents and children in 83 countries in the world". The report asked for contributions from parents; children; organisations; businesses and the general public in order to consider their views and inform their recommendations and identified four themes that were of particular concern to parents and the wider public. These themes were:
 1) the "wallpaper" of children's lives
 2) clothing, products and services for children
 3) children as consumers
 4) making parents' voices heard

The report returned recommendations based on the research from interested parties, on each of the key themes, in the form of "what we would like to see". On the theme of "the wallpaper of children's lives" it said that it would like to see that sexualised images used in public places should be more in line with what parents find acceptable, to ensure that images in public spaces becomes more child friendly. On theme two "clothing, products and services for children" the Bailey report said that it would like to see retailers no longer selling or marketing inappropriate clothing, products or services for children. What they would like to see on theme three "children as consumers" is comprehensive regulation protecting children from excessive commercial pressures across all media in-line with parental expectations; that marketers are ethical and do not attempt to exploit gaps in the market to influence children into becoming consumers and to ensure that parents and children have an awareness of marketing techniques and regulations. Finally in terms of "making parents voices heard", it would like to see parents finding it easier to voice their concerns to, and be listened to by, businesses and regulators.

There is a motion for a European Parliament resolution going through which gives the following definition of sexualization:

Effects on women of color 
The sexualization of women of color is different from the sexualization of white women. The media plays a significant role in this sexualization. "The media are likely to have powerful effects if the information is presented persistently, consistently, and corroborated among forms. As a media affect, stereotypes rely on the repetition to perpetuate and sustain them." According to Celine Parrenas Shimizu, "To see race is to see sex, and vice versa."

Black women 
Many scholars trace the sexualization of Black women back to slavery, where certain stereotypes were invented as a way to dehumanize Black women. These stereotypes include the Jezebel, seen as a light skin overly sexual Black woman with no control over her desires; the Mammy, a dark-skinned fat Black woman who was asexual in nature and whose sole purpose was to cook for a white family; the Sapphire, first shown on the Radio/Television show Amos n' Andy, she was a loud, crude, jealous woman, who took joy in emasculating men. These stereotypes have carried over to the way black girls view themselves and how society views them. The Jezebel stereotype, in particular, has reemerged in the form of hip-hop video vixens. These images seen in music videos have two effects: they influence how black women are viewed in society and they also shape how black women view themselves.

"Representations of black girlhood in the media and popular culture suggest that black girls face a different set of rules when it comes to sex, innocence, and blame", the consequences of the sexualization of Black girls can be seen through the 2004 trial of R. Kelly. The immediate response from the public cleared R. Kelly of any wrongdoing while subsequently blaming the young girl for her abuse. One respondent to a Village Voice article claimed that she wasn't disturbed by the video because in her words, "It wasn't like she was new to the act. [She--the respondent] heard she [the victim] worked it like most of [her] 30 something-year-old friends have yet to learn how to do". This desensitization is directly linked to a music industry—and subsequent fans—who value the artist over their potential victims.” Instead of being correctly labeled as victims these women are instead turned into "groupies, hoochies, and chickenheads". One of the jurors on the R. Kelly case noted that he believed the defense because her body "appeared to developed". Sika A. Dagbovie-Mullins acknowledged that  "this harmful and skewed reasoning reflects a national troubling tendency to view black adolescent females as sexually savvy and therefore responsible themselves for the sexualization and exploitation of their bodies".

Dagbovie-Mullins introduced new problems in regards to the sexualization of Black girls, completely dichotomous to the sexualization of Black girls is the infantilization of Black women. Both of these problems are caused by denying the agency of Black women. Both the infantilization of Black women and the sexualization of Black girls are about looking at Black women purely through the lens of their sexuality, without regard to their agency. There is a link between the images of a submissive woman being portrayed by a girl and a willingness for people to believe that young black girls can give consent. This is a narrative that is supported by the sexy school girl image portrayed in media. The image girls off the illusion of being unavailable—both from a moral and legal standpoint—while at the same time being available. "Music, music videos, and images play a pivotal role in the messages individuals hear and see. These messages can be positive or negative, and they can influence how consumers and producers respond to and interrogate them critically, socially, physically, and emotionally".

The images portrayed "in both African American and mainstream American culture reinforce the lenses through which the everyday experiences and ideal for adolescent African American women are viewed". Shows like the Flavor of Love which rely on the stereotype of the Black pimp and the submissive women, where Flavor Flav strip women of their real name and gives them nicknames such as "Thing 1" and "Thing 2" showcase the denial of the agency of Black women. This denial of agency makes it easier for people to see them as little more than sex symbols.  Infantilizing them and stripping them of all things that make them individuals creates a culture in which Black women are no longer seen as people, but objects used for individual male pleasure. Making it easier to side with men when Black women accuse them of assault because Black Women can't be assaulted when all they want is sex.  

Along with a deflated sense of self-worth, these stereotypes can also influence Black girls—notably poor ones—that their sense of worth and an escape from poverty can be found through their sexualization.  The more modern version of the Jezebel—a black woman who is highly sexual and materialistic—may also have the most importance to inner-city Black girls, "The sexual links to poverty and its relevance to survival are clear. Their lives have been called ‘ghetto fabulous,’ where they are socially embedded in a culture of poverty, yet have the economic means to procure middle-class goods".

Even women are guilty of the sexualization, Nicki Minaj who made the phrase "Barbie Bitch" popular and raps about how she only "fuck[s] with ballers" draw on stereotypes such as the gold digger in order to promote her brand. While the "Bad Bitch Barbie" character was developed out of a history of over-sexualizing the bodies of Black women, it has also been used as a way of Black women to reconquer their sexuality. No longer is it men using their bodies for the enjoyment of other men, but it is they themselves who are showcasing their features as a way of uplifting who they are. Hence, duality is created within hip-hop culture the sexualization of Black women is still being seen, but with the emergence of female artists, we also see an emergence of a counter-culture reclaiming the sexuality of Black Women as their own. While are the same time the "Bad Bitch Barbie" still creates unrealistic images for black girls to compare themselves to. By reclaiming the sexuality that was robbed of them by men, they have introduced a new problem of body dimorphism as Black girls face the pressures to recreate themselves in the images being presented.

In an NPR interview with Professor Herbert Samuels at LaGuardia Community College in New York and Professor Mireille Miller-Young at UC Santa Barbara, they talk about sexual stereotypes of black bodies in America and how even in sex work, already a dangerous job, black women are treated much worse than their counterparts due to the effects of their over-sexualization and objectification in society. Black women's bodies are either invisible or hypervisible. In the 1800s, a South African woman named Sarah Baartman was known as "Hottentot Venus" and her body was paraded around in London and Paris where they looked at her exotic features such as large breasts and behind. Her features were deemed lesser and over sexual.

Asian women 

The image of Asian women in Hollywood cinema is directly linked to sexuality as essential to any imagining about the roles they play as well as her actual appearance in popular culture. Asian female fatale's hypersexualized subjection is derived from her sexual behavior that is considered as natural to her particular race and culture. Two types of Asian stereotypes that are commonly found in media are the Lotus Flower and the Dragon Lady. The Lotus Flower archetype is the "self-sacrificing, servile, and suicidal Asian woman." The dragon lady archetype is the opposite of the lotus flower, a "self-abnegating Asian woman…[who] uses her 'Oriental' femininity, associated with seduction and danger to trap white men on behalf of conniving Asian males." According to film-maker and film scholar, Celine Shimizu, "The figure of the Asian American femme fatale signifies a particular deathly seduction. She attracts with her soft, unthreatening, and servile femininity while concealing her hard, dangerous, and domineering nature."

Native American women 
Starting from the time of white colonization of Native American land, some Native American women have been referred to as "squaw", an Algonquin word for vagina. "The 'squaw' [stereotype] is the dirty, subservient, and abused tribal female who is also haggard, violent, and eager to torture tribal captives." Another stereotype is the beautiful Indian princess who leaves her tribe and culture behind to marry a white man.

Latina women 
Latina characters that embody the "hot Latina" stereotype in film and television are marked by easily identifiable behavioral characteristics such as "'addictively romantic, sensual, sexual and even exotically dangerous', self-sacrificing, dependent, powerless, sexually naive, childlike, pampered, and irresponsible". Stereotypical Latina physical characteristics include "red lips, big bottoms, large hips, voluptuous bosoms, and small waists" and "high heels, huge hoop earrings, seductive clothing." Within the "hot Latina" stereotype lies three categories of representation: the Cantina Girl, the Faithful, self-sacrificing señorita, and the vamp. The Cantina Girl markers are "'great sexual allure', teasing, dancing, and 'behaving in an alluring fashion.'" The faithful, self-sacrificing Señorita starts out as a good girl and turns bad by the end. The Señorita, in an attempt to save her Anglo love interest, utilizes her body to protect him from violence. The Vamp representation "uses her intellectual and devious sexual wiles to get what she wants." The media represents Latinas "as either [a] hot-blooded spitfire" or "[a] dutiful mother". The sexual implications of the "hot-blooded" Latina has become an overgeneralized representation of Latin people. This has led many to see the Latin people as "what is morally wrong" with the United States. Some believe it to be wrong simply because the interpretation of this culture seems to go against white, Western culture. Culturally, the Latina is expected to dress "as a proper señorita" in order to be respected as a woman which conflicts with the Western ideals that a girl is sexual if she dresses "too 'mature' for [her] age". Even in the business world this stereotype continues; "tight skirts and jingling bracelets [are misinterpreted] as a come-on". This sexualization can also be linked to certain stereotypical jobs. The image of the Latina woman often is not in the business world but in the domestic. The sexualization of Latina women sexualizes the positions that they are expected to occupy. Domestic servants, maids, and waitresses are the typical "media-engendered" roles that make it difficult for Latinas to gain "upward mobility" despite the fact that many hold PhDs.

Dominican women 
In the Dominican Republic, women are frequently stereotyped as sultry and sexual as the reputation of Dominican sex workers grows. Many poor women have resorted to sex work because the demand is high and the hours and pay are often dictated by the workers themselves. White European and American men "exoticize dark-skinned 'native' bodies" because "they can buy sex for cut-rate prices". This overgeneralizing of the sexuality of Dominican women can also carry back to the women's homes. Even "women who...worked in Europe have become suspect..." even if they had a legal job. They have become "exports" instead of people because of their sexualization.

Differences in the exotic dance industry 
Throughout the years, the feminist movement has worked to make sex work less oppressive and maintain more agency within the worker's rights. The sex industry inherently sexualizes the women that take part in it as a source of income, but women of color tend to face unequal conditions and fall prey to stereotypes placed on them. Sexual objectification and power imbalances are more likely to occur due to the transaction between the client and sex worker because of the dependency of the worker on the money holder. In environments such as these, it is still important to maintain respect for individuals whether the service provider or client. Though, race discrimination does happen within the workplace. Just as well, so does sexual harassment since these two events are not exclusive to one another and intersect. In the sex industry as a whole, we can see that the view of sex work people tend to reflect on the way they believe women should be treated, especially their racial attitudes and biases. But completely banning people from working in these industries does not resolve the need for change and respect upheld for both White exotic dancers and exotic dancers of color. Though, these women are still subjected to certain stereotypes that are glorified in the sex industry.

There is still a large gap in the stratification of gender and race and how that affects the oppressive environments some workers deal with every day. For exotic dancers, differences are weighed by the wage gap based on skin color, general treatment, and the violence they experience in their environments. Clients oftentimes associate a sense of refinement and class to people who advertise themselves as a mix of White and drop their racial background of Black. In terms of hiring differences, women who work at certain clubs are reflective of the crowds they are catering to. White women are usually used in order to attract middle-class businessmen, while women of color, specifically women of darker skin tones, are hired to attract working-class customers. This essentially labels women as a certain product to be sold and creates a rank order who will earn more. The exotic dancers of the clubs highly reflect the Women of darker skin tones also have fewer body restrictions, focusing more on their "voluptuous" curvature, and have to be more creative with how they present themselves to their audience just to earn a little extra. For instance, some women of color earn a large difference of $100 to $300 in tips compared to White women. This alludes to a certain sense of quality placed on the dancers dependent on race, seeing as White women are offered more. Women of color tend to have to go through more extreme lengths in order to accommodate the lower amounts of money they are tipped. Many dancers of color are willing to perform sex acts in order to make a higher profit from their work.

This brings into question the overall safety of the dancers in lower-income places whose only option is to appeal to more working-class people just because that is their only audience. Customers tend to hypersexualize women of color and as a result of that direct objectification, they tend to spend less money for their services. This is how customers lure exotic dancers into desperately needing more money to make their wages, making them perform illegal and unsafe sex acts in return. From these illegal services, we can see that many strippers of color, or strippers in general, begin to sell their bodies for money, which is illegal in some countries. Though this is not the only unsafe aspect of selling their body. Some women are asked to insert foreign objects into their bodies, to do amusing dances or other acts that continuously humiliate the dancer. From this, we can see that the client keeps a certain power over the dancer. They not only hold monetary promises over the dancer, but they also separate themselves from simple pleasure into more humiliation based acts. This might be the separation between "I do not like darker-skinned women" in a physical sexual sense, and lets the client who does not particularly like dark-skinned women to receive some sort of pleasure in the end. Though the dissonance is there, they get a power high.

American Psychological Association view

Definition 
The American Psychological Association (APA) in its 2007 Report looked at the cognitive and emotional consequences of sexualization and the consequences for mental and physical health, and impact on development of a healthy sexual self-image. The report considers that a person is sexualized in the following situations:
 a person's value comes only from his or her sexual appeal or sexual behavior, to the exclusion of other characteristics;
 a person is held to a standard that equates physical attractiveness (narrowly defined) with being sexy;
 a person is sexually objectified—that is, made into a thing for others' sexual use, rather than seen as a person with the capacity for independent action and decision making; and/or
 sexuality is inappropriately imposed upon a person.

General psychological effects 
According to models of objectification, viewing someone as a body induces de-mentalization, stripping away their psychological traits. Another model suggests instead a body focus strips a person of agency (self-control and action) and competence and increases perceptions of experience (emotion and sensation).

Children 
Some cultural critics have postulated that over recent decades children have evidenced a level of sexual knowledge or sexual behaviour inappropriate for their age group.

The causes of this premature sexualization that have been cited include portrayals in the media of sex and related issues, especially in media aimed at children; the lack of parental oversight and discipline; access to adult culture via the internet; and the lack of comprehensive school sex education programs.

For girls and young women in particular, the APA reports that studies have found that sexualization has a negative impact on their "self-image and healthy development".

The APA cites the following as advertising techniques that contribute to the sexualization of girls:
 Including girls in ads with sexualized women wearing matching clothing or posed seductively.
 Dressing girls up to look like adult women.
 Dressing women down to look like young girls.
 The employment of youthful celebrity adolescents in highly sexual ways to promote or endorse products.
The APA additionally further references the teen magazine market by citing a study by Roberts et al that found that "47% of 8- to 18-year-old [girls] reported having read at least 5 minutes of a magazine the previous day." A majority of these magazines focused on a theme of presenting oneself as sexually desirable to men, a practice which is called "costuming for seduction" in a study by Duffy and Gotcher.

Cognitive and emotional consequences 
Studies have found that thinking about the body and comparing it to sexualized cultural ideals may disrupt a girl's mental concentration, and a girl's sexualization or objectification may undermine her confidence in and comfort with her own body, leading to emotional and self-image problems, such as shame and anxiety.

Research has linked sexualization with three of the most common mental health problems diagnosed in girls and women: eating disorders, low self-esteem, and depression or depressed mood.

Research suggests that the sexualization of girls has negative consequences on girls' ability to develop a healthy sexual self-image.

A result of the sexualization of girls in the media is that young girls are "learning how to view themselves as sex objects". When girls fail to meet the thin ideal and dominant culture's standard of beauty they can develop anxieties. Sexualization is problematic for young children who are developing their sexual identity as they may think that turning themselves into sex objects is empowering and related to having sexual agency.

Products for children 
Some commercial products seen as promoting the sexualization of children have drawn considerable media attention:
 Bratz Baby Dolls marketed at 6-year-old girls that feature sexualized clothing, like fishnet stockings, feather boas, and miniskirts   
 Highly sexualized and gendered Halloween costumes marketed at young girls, such as the "sexy firefighter", a costume that consists of a tight fitted mini dress and high heeled boots. 
 Girls aged 10 and 11 wearing thongs in primary school. 
 Clothing such T-shirts being marketed for young children in preschool and elementary school with printed slogans like "So Many Boys So Little Time" 
 Padded bras on bikinis aimed at seven-year-old girls. Some people regard training bras similarly. However, there is also evidence that with the mean age of puberty declining in Western cultures, functional brassieres are required by a higher percentage of preteen girls than before.

The Scottish Executive report surveyed 32 High street UK retailers and found that many of the larger chains, including Tesco, Debenhams, JJ Sports, and Marks & Spencer did not offer sexualized goods aimed at children. The report noted that overall prevalence was limited but this was based on a very narrow research brief. Whilst this shows that not all High street retailers were aiming products deemed sexualized by the researchers, the research cannot be taken out of context and used to say that there is not an issue of sexualization.

Culture and media 

Sexualization has also been a subject of debate for academics who work in media and cultural studies. Here, the term has not been used simply to label what is seen as a social problem, but to indicate the much broader and varied set of ways in which sex has become more visible in media and culture. These include;
the widespread discussion of sexual values, practices and identities in the media;
the growth of sexual media of all kinds; for example, erotica, slash fiction, sexual self-help books and the many genres of pornography; 
the emergence of new forms of sexual experience, for example instant message or avatar sex made possible by developments in technology; 
a public concern with the breakdown of consensus about regulations for defining and dealing with obscenity; 
the prevalence of scandals, controversies and panics around sex in the media.

The terms "pornification" and "pornographication" have also been used to describe the way that aesthetics that were previously associated with pornography have become part of popular culture, and that mainstream media texts and other cultural practices "citing pornographic styles, gestures and aesthetics" have become more prominent. This process, which Brian McNair has described as a "pornographication of the mainstream". has developed alongside an expansion of the cultural realm of pornography or "pornosphere" which itself has become more accessible to a much wider variety of audiences. According to McNair, both developments can be set in the context of a wider shift towards a "striptease culture" which has disrupted the boundaries between public and private discourse in late modern Western culture, and which is evident more generally in cultural trends which privilege lifestyle, reality, interactivity, self-revelation and public intimacy.

Children and adolescents spend more time engaging with media than any other age group. This is a time in their life that they are more susceptible to information that they receive. Children are getting sex education from the media, little kids are exposed to sexualized images and more information than ever before in human history but are not able to process the information, they are not developmentally ready to process it, and this impacts their development and behavior.

Sexualization of young girls in the media and infantilization of women creates an environment where it becomes more acceptable to view children as "seductive and sexy". It makes having healthy sexual relationships more difficult for people and creates sexist attitudes.

Criticism 
The Australian writers, Catharine Lumby and Kath Albury (2010) have suggested that sexualization is "a debate that has been simmering for almost a decade" and concerns about sex and the media are far from new. Much of the recent writing on sexualization has been the subject of criticism that because of the way that it draws on "one-sided, selective, overly simplifying, generalizing, and negatively toned" evidence and is "saturated in the languages of concern and regulation". In these writings and the widespread press coverage that they have attracted, critics state that the term is often used as "a non-sequitur causing everything from girls flirting with older men to child sex trafficking" They believe that the arguments often ignore feminist work on media, gender and the body and present a very conservative and negative view of sex in which only monogamous heterosexual sexuality is regarded as normal. They say that the arguments tend to neglect any historical understanding of the way sex has been represented and regulated, and they often ignore both theoretical and empirical work on the relationship between sex and media, culture and technology.

The way society shapes ones personal interest is presented in a book review of Girls Gone Skank by Patrice Oppliger, Amanda Mills states that "consequently, girls are socialized to participate in their own abuse by becoming avid consumers of and altering their behavior to reflect sexually exploitative images and goods." The belief that women are powerful and fully capable as men is stated in the text "Uses of the Erotic: The Erotic As Power" by Audre Lorde stating that the suppression of the erotic of women has led them feeling superior to men "the superficially, erotic had been encouraged as a sign of female inferiority on the other hand women have been made to suffer and to feel opposed contemptible and suspect by virtue of its existence".

See also 

 Child sexuality
 Sexualism
 Bratz
 Kogal
 Miss Bimbo
 Rosalind Gill
 Rape culture
 Sexual objectification
 Pornographication
 Social impact of thong underwear
 Sexualization in the video games industry
 Pornified
 Female Chauvinist Pigs: Women and the Rise of Raunch Culture

Notes

References

Further reading

Books 
 
 
  A guide for parents on girls' body image and other issues.
 
  Looks at media messges and suggests that it promotes early maturation and sexualisation of pre-adolescent girls. 
 
 
 
  
  A review of what Levy regards as a highly sexualized American culture in which women are objectified, objectify one another, and are encouraged to objectify themselves. 
   Looks at sex in contemporary culture and the impact it has on young girls. 
 
 Also available as: 
 
  Discusses issues women face in American society and how those issues reflect on young girls and teens. 
See also: 
 
  Pamela Paul discusses the impact of ready access to pornography on Americans.
  Argues that pornography has become a mainstream part of American culture.

Journals 
 
  Online.
  Online.
  Online.
 
 
 
  Pdf.

Reports 
 
  Pdf version.
  Pdf.

Online resources 
 
 
 

 
Feminism and society
Women in society
Women's rights legislation